Paraf-e Pain (also Romanized as Pārāf-e Pā’īn) is a village in Byaban Rural District, Byaban District, Minab County, Hormozgan Province, Iran. At the 2006 census, its population was 145, in 26 families.

References 

Populated places in Minab County